Clifford Williams may refer to:
 Cliff Williams (rugby union, born 1898) (1898–1930), Welsh international rugby union hooker
 Clifford Williams (politician) (1905–1987), Welsh Member of Parliament
 Clifford Williams (actor) (1926–2005), Welsh theatre director and stage actor
 Clifford Williams, American victim of wrongful conviction, see Hubert Nathan Myers and Clifford Williams
 Cliff Williams (rugby, born 1939) (1939–2014), rugby league footballer of the 1970s for Wales, and Hunslet
 Clifford Williams (philosopher) (born 1943), American author and philosopher
 Cliff Williams (basketball) (born 1945), American basketball player
 Cliff Williams (born 1949), English bassist for Australian band AC/DC